Jacob Perreault (born April 15, 2002)  is a Canadian professional ice hockey right winger currently playing for the San Diego Gulls in the American Hockey League (AHL) as a prospect to the Anaheim Ducks of the National Hockey League (NHL). He was drafted 27th overall by the Ducks in the 2020 NHL Entry Draft. On November 6, 2020, Perreault was signed by the Ducks to a three-year, entry-level contract.

Personal life
Perreault was born on April 15, 2002, in Montreal to Yanic Perreault and his wife July. His father is a former professional ice hockey player who played for the Los Angeles Kings, Toronto Maple Leafs, Montreal Canadiens, Nashville Predators, Phoenix Coyotes, and Chicago Blackhawks and was a member of the Canadiens at the time of his birth. Growing up, Perreault and his siblings Jeremy, Liliane and Gabriel all played hockey and worked on their shot in their basement.

Career statistics

Regular season and playoffs

International

References

External links

2002 births
Living people
Anaheim Ducks draft picks
Anaheim Ducks players
National Hockey League first-round draft picks
San Diego Gulls (AHL) players
Sarnia Sting players
Ice hockey people from Montreal